Adam Robak (born 16 July 1957) is a retired Polish fencer. He won a team gold medal at the 1978 World Fencing Championships in Hamburg and a bronze medal in the team foil event at the 1980 Summer Olympics.

References

1957 births
Living people
Polish male fencers
Olympic fencers of Poland
Fencers at the 1980 Summer Olympics
Olympic bronze medalists for Poland
Fencers from Warsaw
Olympic medalists in fencing
Medalists at the 1980 Summer Olympics
Universiade medalists in fencing
Universiade gold medalists for Poland
Medalists at the 1985 Summer Universiade
21st-century Polish people
20th-century Polish people